Wilfredo González (born 6 January 1993) is a Guatemalan tennis player.

González has a career high ATP singles ranking of 1011 achieved on 27 February 2017. He also has a career high ATP doubles ranking of 886 achieved on 12 September 2016.

He represents Guatemala at the Davis Cup where he has a W/L record of 15–6.

External links
 
 
 

1993 births
Living people
Guatemalan male tennis players
Sportspeople from Guatemala City
Tennis players at the 2019 Pan American Games
Central American and Caribbean Games silver medalists for Guatemala
Central American and Caribbean Games medalists in tennis
Tennis players at the 2015 Pan American Games
Pan American Games competitors for Guatemala
21st-century Guatemalan people
20th-century Guatemalan people